Jens Fredrik Karlsson (born November 7, 1982) is a professional Swedish ice hockey player. He is currently a left winger for Borås HC in the Swedish second division, HockeyAllsvenskan.

Playing career
Previously, Karlsson played in Sweden's Elitserien for Frölunda HC and HV71 as well as Rögle BK in HockeyAllsvenskan, and the Iserlohn Roosters of the German Deutsche Eishockey Liga. Despite being drafted 18th overall in the first round of the 2001 NHL Entry Draft by the Los Angeles Kings, he never signed a contract with the team and never played in the NHL.

Career statistics

Regular season and playoffs

International

External links

1982 births
Borås HC players
Frölunda HC players
HV71 players
Living people
National Hockey League first-round draft picks
Los Angeles Kings draft picks
Rögle BK players
Swedish ice hockey left wingers
Swedish expatriate ice hockey players in Denmark
Swedish expatriate ice hockey players in Germany
Iserlohn Roosters players
Ice hockey people from Gothenburg